Coleophora directella is a moth of the family Coleophoridae. It is found in most of Europe, except Great Britain, Ireland, the Iberian Peninsula and the Balkan Peninsula. It is also known from China.

The wingspan is about 17 mm.

The larvae feed on Artemisia campestris and Helichrysum species. They create a long, hairy, three-valved tubular case. The mouth angle is about 70°. Larvae can be found from September to June of the following year.

References

directella
Moths described in 1849
Moths of Europe
Moths of Asia